Eugenia colipensis is a species of plant in the family Myrtaceae. It is endemic to Mexico.

References

Endemic flora of Mexico
colipensis
Vulnerable plants
Taxonomy articles created by Polbot